"ICTV2" ("International Commercial Television and Radio Company") is a Ukrainian TV channel, part of the Starlight Media group. It launched in December 2022, replacing , which had been an internationally oriented service.

History 
The new license changed the service's name to ICTV2 and shifted its content to series, shows and full-length films. Rebranding took place on December 17.

On December 22 of the same year, the National Council issued a temporary permission for the broadcasting of "ICTV2" during the period of martial law in Ukraine for broadcasting in the multiplex MX-2 of the digital broadcast network DVB-T2. The channel started broadcasting on the network the next day, December 23.

Notes 

2022 establishments in Ukraine
Television networks in Ukraine
Television channels and stations established in 2022